Gia Abrassart is a journalist and activist based in Belgium.

Biography 
Abrassat began her career in hospitality, before working for the International Committee of the Red Cross. She then returned to university to study journalism at the Université libre de Bruxelles.

In 2012, she was a co-founder of the Warrior Poets collective. In 2015, she co-wrote the Créer en postcolonie 2010-2015. Voix et dissidences belgo-congolaises book with Sarah Demart. That year, she also launched a lemon-and-ginger brand of drinks called Ginger G. In 2018, she founded the Café Congo in the Studio CityGate, in Anderlecht, as a cultural space.

References 

Belgian journalists
Year of birth missing (living people)
Living people